The Olympia's Tour is a cycling stage race held in the Netherlands.

History
A.S.C. Olympia was founded in Amsterdam on 27 November 1898. It ran one-day races but wanted a race through all the Netherlands. The first Olympia's Tour was in 1909, with three stages and one rest day. The second in 1910 went to Maastricht and Groningen. It was 17 years before the third race, partly because races on public roads were forbidden in the Netherlands during the First World War. An international field with 16 Germans, the champions of Switzerland and Luxembourg and around 40 Dutch riders left the Rembrandtplein on 17 August 1927. The Dutch were mainly amateurs, the Germans sponsored riders who rode for bicycle manufacturers such as Opel and Diamant which provided material and a support team. The German Rudolf Wolke won after four stages and 800 kilometres ahead of Janus Braspennincx. It was the last race until 1955.

The race resumed on 17 June 1955, with 93 riders leaving Stadionplein in Amsterdam South for a stage of 212 km to Hoogeveen. The race was a battle until the end, when 26-year-old Piet Kooyman won. After 1955 the race was held every year except 2001, when it was stopped by a foot-and-mouth disease crisis, and the COVID-19 pandemic in the Netherlands cancelled the 2020 and 2021 editions of the race.

Some winners have become successful professionals. They include Henk Nijdam, Frits Schür, Cees Priem, Fedor den Hertog, Leo van Vliet, John Talen, Servais Knaven, Danny Nelissen, Matthé Pronk, Joost Posthuma and Thomas Dekker.

Past winners

References

Cycle races in the Netherlands
1909 establishments in the Netherlands
Recurring sporting events established in 1909
UCI Europe Tour races